The Home chain of nightclubs was initially started at the height of popularity of house music. The chain was originally called "Jacobs" until being bought out in 2015. The clubs are notorious for their "anti mobile phones" policy, where phones are confiscated before entrance, and when people breach this rule, a form of "punishment" is implemented. The two clubs at the time were two of the largest nightclubs in their respective countries, and were of a number of dance music enterprises operated by the one company, including various other smaller clubs and the outdoor music festival Homelands.

The broader chain, including the Home Club in London and its outdoor events eventually folded, now Home in Sydney has continued as a successful venue and hosts many famous dance music DJs.

Background 
At its peak, the Home Nightclub chain included two large clubs in Sydney and London, as well as hosting the outdoor Homelands dance music festival. The Nightclub chain was the dream of Ron Mcculloch and Big Beats (Inc) who had intended for a broader worldwide chain of clubs including having advanced plans for a New York club, as well as plans for clubs in Singapore and Buenos Aires and outdoor events held in various part of the world. The club is notorious for its no drinks policy, which comes with unfortunate "punishments" for people who fail to follow the rules. The idea of the clubs was that they would beam performances of DJs to each other, and have International events by transmission. The two clubs in Sydney and London were among the biggest Dance music clubs in their respected countries.

Club openings 
The Sydney Club was the first to open on 13 November 1998 by Antonio Zambarelli, Paul Collings, George Swanson and Ron McCulloch (Big Beat Australia) in Cockle Bay, Darling Harbour. It was purposely built as a nightclub, and holding 2000 people, it is one of Australia's biggest regular house music venues. The interior was designed by Ron McCulloch, and it features a number of different spaces. The main dancefloor holds 700 people. It cost  to build.

The London Home Club (see full article Home (nightclub)) was a "superclub" in the middle of London on Leicester Square, opened in 1998. It had eight levels, and cost £8.5m to build, after hard negotiations over building at the Leicester Square site.

Closure of London Home and the collapse of Big Beat 
However, Home in London was shut by police only 2 years after its opening. It had its licence revoked by police because of evidence of obvious drug dealing in the premises, flagged by an undercover police operation which discovered "open and serious Class A drug dealing and usage". At this stage, Home London was owned by Big Beats Pubs and Club Empire, it being jointly owned by Mr McCulloch, George Swanson (the former Whitbread director), and Royal Bank Development Capital.

The closing of Home London affected the Big Beats company, which then went into receivership. While the licence was reinstated, it was too late for Big Beat. Big Beat's Home nightclubs assets were initially contracted by the receiver, KPMG, to be run by the Mean Fiddler business. The London club was then purchased for £20m by the Mean Fiddler business, owned by John Vincent Power. However, Ron McCulloch, from Big Beat, then purchased the Sydney Home Club himself and moved to Australia

Continuation of Sydney Home 
Sydney Home (officially called Home The Venue) continued operating without issue and still is a successful venue today, at the popular Darling Harbour waterside entertainment district in Sydney.  In the early 2000s it incorporated the successful Pitt Street club Sublime in the late 1990s, run by Simon Page. Simon brought the three nights that were being run at Sublime, Beatfix, Cargo and Voodoo and moved its DJs (including Peewee Ferris, Nik Fish, Craig Obey, Bexta and Kate Monroe) into Home's Friday night. The Friday Sublime night has continued to run successfully since that time. After some arising family issues, Simon sold his interest to McCulloch. In 2005, Ron McCulloch sold the club back to Simon page for roughly what he had purchased it for. With the downturn from the peak of interest in dancemusic, and the return of an interest in rock, Sydney Home also expanded into rock music in 2006, hosting bands on Saturday nights, then followed by DJs.

See also

List of electronic dance music venues

References 

Drinking establishment chains
Nightclubs in Australia
Electronic dance music venues